Puwa Township is a township situated within Fangshan District, Beijing, China. It Nanbianqiao Village to the north, Xiayunling Township to the east, Shidu Town to the south, and Magezhuang Village to the west. As of 2020, it had a total population of 2,074.

History

Administrative Divisions 

As of 2021, Puwa township had 8 villages within its borders. They are listed as follows:

See also 
 List of township-level divisions of Beijing

References 

Fangshan District
Township-level divisions of Beijing